The National Basketball Association (NBA) has faced a multitude of criticisms from sports publications, fans, and its own players.

Racial and cultural issues
Since the late 1990s, and especially since the retirement of Michael Jordan in 1999, the NBA has been criticized for embracing hip hop culture. While some observers have argued that this criticism has more to do with race than hip hop itself, it is a fact that the league is very much connected to hip hop culture. Rappers Nelly and Jay-Z had ownership stakes in NBA teams (the Charlotte Hornets and Brooklyn Nets respectively), and many artists have worn NBA throwback jerseys in music videos. In turn, the NBA plays rap and hip-hop in arenas during games. NBA video games NBA 2K and NBA Live use hip-hop in their soundtracks, and ABC/ESPN also use the music during its coverage. Players in the NBA have tried having rap or hip hop careers themselves (Shaquille O'Neal, Kobe Bryant, Tony Parker, Allen Iverson, Chris Webber, Damian Lillard and Ron Artest are some examples) and several also dress and act in ways that are in accordance with the hip hop culture (for example, Ja Morant).

Some have argued that the criticism of the NBA is hypocritical, considering the relative lack of criticism of Major League Baseball (MLB), National Hockey League (NHL) or National Football League (NFL) players. Some have also noticed that music genres and sports partnerships are not limited to the NBA, with alternative rock and hard rock being associated with the NHL, and country music being associated with NASCAR.

Donald Sterling

Accusations of discrimination
In February 2009, Los Angeles Clippers owner Donald Sterling was sued by former longtime Clippers executive Elgin Baylor for employment discrimination on the basis of age and race. The lawsuit alleges Sterling told Baylor that he wanted to fill his team with "poor black boys from the South and a white head coach". The suit alleges that during negotiations for Danny Manning, Sterling said "I'm offering a lot of money for a poor black kid." The suit noted those comments while alleging "the Caucasian head coach was given a four-year, $22-million contract", but Baylor's salary had "been frozen at a comparatively paltry $350,000 since 2003".

Accusation of racism
On April 25, 2014, TMZ Sports released what it said is an April 9, 2014 audio recording of a conversation between Sterling and his mistress, V. Stiviano. According to TMZ, Sterling and Stiviano argued in regards to a photo Stiviano posted on Instagram in which she posed with Magic Johnson. In the audio recording, Sterling allegedly tells Stiviano: "It bothers me a lot that you want to broadcast that you’re associating with black people." and, "You can sleep with [black people]. You can bring them in, you can do whatever you want", but "the little I ask you is ... not to bring them to my games". Clippers president Andy Roesen issued a statement the following day, indicating that his organization was unsure if it was a legitimate and unaltered recording, that the sentiments attributed to Sterling did not reflect Sterling's views, and that the woman on the recording was being sued by the Sterling family and had "told Mr. Sterling that she would 'get even' with him". The Los Angeles chapter of the National Association for the Advancement of Colored People (NAACP) cancelled its plans for the following month to award Sterling for a second time with its lifetime achievement award. President Barack Obama characterized the recording attributed to Sterling as "incredibly offensive racist statements". Obama then stated, "When ignorant folks want to advertise their ignorance, you don’t really have to do anything, you just let them talk." On April 29, the NBA, upon confirming the taped conversations, announced that Sterling has been banned for life and fined $2.5 million.

Dress code

The NBA instituted a dress code in 2005, banning all clothing associated with the hip hop culture. Players were instructed not to wear jewelry, throwback jerseys, headphones, indoor sunglasses and other accessories, and instead were told to wear "business casual" clothing. The dress code, characterized by some as "clearly and unapologetically directed toward suppressing hip-hop culture", was instantly controversial and a topic on many sports radio talk shows for several days.

Baggy shorts, also a symbol of hip hop culture, were banned by the league as well, which instituted a rule on the length of players' shorts while playing. Tights, which players started to wear under their shorts in the 2005–06 season (though not a symbol of hip hop culture) were banned as well. No players were fined for dress code violations during the 2005–06 season. The league has also attempted to more greatly distance itself from hip hop since the infamous Malice at the Palace brawl in 2004; in the 2005 NBA All-Star Game, country music stars Big and Rich performed at halftime, a move that was ridiculed by TNT analyst and former NBA player Charles Barkley. In addition, as noted later in this article, ABC Sports (after relying on hip-hop music early on) has used artists such as Rob Thomas and Tom Petty for the NBA Finals in recent years.

Since Adam Silver became commissioner, however, the dress code was loosened somewhat, especially during and after the 2020 NBA Bubble. The sport coat was no longer required to wear in games and during league and team activities, with coaches now wearing Nike-produced polo shirts in place of suits and ties during games.

Team relocation controversies

Vancouver Grizzlies move to Memphis

The Vancouver Grizzlies moved to Memphis, Tennessee after the 2000–01 NBA season. On January 25, 2001, it was announced that the Grizzlies would be sold by Orca Bay Sports & Entertainment to Michael Heisley, who originally intended to keep the team in Vancouver. However, the team moved, in part due to the weak Canadian dollar, lack of local ownership, and the unwillingness of some players to live in Canada. After a bidding war between Memphis, Louisville, Anaheim and New Orleans, Heisley selected Memphis as the relocation destination for the Grizzlies on March 26, 2001. Heisley selected Memphis because it offered a better deal and had better local executive leadership than Louisville. Eventually, the NBA Board of Governors approved the team's plans to move to Memphis on July 4, 2001 and the team became the Memphis Grizzlies for the 2001–02 NBA season.

Seattle SuperSonics move to Oklahoma City

The Seattle SuperSonics moved to Oklahoma City after the 2007–08 NBA season. After failed efforts to persuade Washington state government officials to provide funding to update KeyArena, the SuperSonics' ownership group, led by Starbucks CEO Howard Schultz, sold the team to Professional Basketball Club LLC (PBC), an investment group headed by Oklahoma City businessman Clay Bennett. After failing to persuade local governments to fund a US$500 million arena complex, Bennett's group notified the NBA that it intended to move the team to Oklahoma City and requested arbitration with the city of Seattle to be released from its lease with KeyArena. When the request was rejected by a judge, Seattle sued Bennett's group to enforce the lease that required the team to play in KeyArena through 2010. On July 2, 2008, a settlement was reached that allowed the team to move under certain conditions. Details of the settlement revealed that PBC would pay the city of Seattle $45 million immediately in exchange for breaking the KeyArena lease and an additional $30 million if Seattle was not given a replacement team in five years. Also, according to the conditions of the settlement, the Sonics' name and colors could not be used by the team in Oklahoma City, but could be taken by a future team in Seattle, although no promises for a replacement team were given. The Oklahoma City team would retain the franchise history of the SuperSonics, which could be "shared" with any future NBA team in Seattle. The team moved to Oklahoma City immediately and became the Oklahoma City Thunder, beginning play for the 2008–09 NBA season.

Altercations

Latrell Sprewell choking incident
In 1997, Latrell Sprewell was involved in arguably the most infamous incident in the NBA prior to the Pacers–Pistons brawl seven years later.

During a contentious practice, then-Golden State Warrior Sprewell was involved in an altercation with head coach P.J. Carlesimo in which he choked his coach and threatened to kill him.

The incident brought mainstream attention, but not quite the amount of criticism of the league as a whole as later controversies would. While some wondered if Sprewell's actions were indicative of a growing trend in the league, others tempered that belief with the idea that it was an isolated incident. Then active player Buck Williams said this on PBS:

Sprewell would have his image redeemed somewhat after a run to the NBA Finals with the New York Knicks in 1999. However, after a contentious battle with the Minnesota Timberwolves over his salary in 2004, his image took another hit. Sprewell retired for good in 2005. After his retirement, he suffered several financial difficulties, including his home being foreclosed on and having his yacht forcibly seized and sold at auction.

Pacers–Pistons brawl

After a massive altercation between Indiana Pacers players and Detroit Pistons fans on November 19, 2004, the NBA came under severe criticism from the national and mainstream media. Commentators, and those familiar with the event outside the sports media, were divided over the issues of who should primarily be blamed for the incident. Anger and blame was placed on the players, at NBA Union Chief Billy Hunter, who protested the length of suspensions, the fans who sparked the melee and the referees who did not put a stop to it.

Some in the media viewed the brawl as a statement on the disconnect between white fans and black players. USA Todays Ian O'Connor wrote:

In the wake of the brawl, the NBA came under harsh scrutiny from some outlets. Noted conservative radio personality (and former ESPN NFL analyst) Rush Limbaugh said the brawl was "hip-hop culture on parade" and also added the statement that "NBA uniforms are now in gang colors. They are in gang styles." NBA commissioner David Stern, in a 2006 interview, made this comment about the brawl-related criticism:

Knicks–Nuggets brawl

The Knicks-Nuggets brawl was an on-court altercation at an NBA game between the New York Knicks and Denver Nuggets at Madison Square Garden on December 16, 2006. This altercation was the most penalized on-court fight since the Pacers–Pistons brawl.

All ten players on the court at the time of the altercation were ejected, and seven players total were suspended. Carmelo Anthony of the Nuggets was suspended for 15 games, while J. R. Smith and Nate Robinson were suspended for 10 games each. Neither coach was suspended; still, some believed that then-Knicks coach Isiah Thomas should have been suspended for allegedly telling his players to foul any Nuggets player who attempted a dunk or layup. NBA Commissioner David Stern received criticism for not including Thomas in the suspensions. Some viewed Stern's leniency as evidence of a special relationship with Thomas.

Thomas was accused of trying to bring back the mentality of the late 1980s Detroit Pistons, who were known for their physical play. Various columnists and observers found Thomas' actions inappropriate; before the fight, Thomas was seen warning Anthony not to go into the lane. ESPN analyst and former NBA player Greg Anthony stated that "I never had a coach say that to an opponent ... I've had a coach say, do a better job protecting our territory. That's a little different."

The fight brought a large amount of media attention, and was a topic on mainstream news broadcasts, including World News with Charles Gibson. Several columnists claimed that the NBA had been set back several years, and many used the fight as evidence of the league being a haven for thugs.

Knicks guard Steve Francis noted that the media reaction to the fight and the suspensions itself were "racially motivated". Francis argued that MLB and the NHL had fights worse or equal to the Knicks/Nuggets altercation and rarely faced the type of media attention and scrutiny that the NBA received. Several columnists agreed, including Sam Smith (who called the coverage "racist and nonsense" in a piece), J. A. Adande and David Aldridge.

Age limit

In 2005, the NBA was in the midst of creating a new collective bargaining agreement. One of the main topics of the deal was the league's desire to create a new age limit for players to enter the NBA draft.

The idea of an age limit had been talked about for several years, after the entrance into the league of several high school players. While several players who have entered the league out of high school have become successes (Kobe Bryant, LeBron James, Kevin Garnett, Dwight Howard, J. R. Smith, Amar'e Stoudemire, Jermaine O'Neal, Rashard Lewis, Tracy McGrady, and decades ago, Shawn Kemp and Moses Malone), others have been relative failures (for example, Ndudi Ebi, James Lang, Kwame Brown, Sebastian Telfair, Eddy Curry, Robert Swift, DeSagana Diop). Those in favor of an age limit made the argument that players entering the league out of high school did not know the fundamentals of playing professional basketball and also were not mature enough to handle playing in the NBA.

Proponents of the age limit included Michael Wilbon, who argued that it was important for young players to get an education. Wilbon's belief, while held by many, has also been referred to as "simplistic" and "[reflective] not just [of] hypocrisy but a reimagination of reality as well". Michael Mccann of the Mississippi College School of Law made this argument:

Greg Anthony was one prominent NBA personality against the age limit. Anthony's belief was that people should be able to make their own decisions about whether or not to enter the league, and that (quoting an article and not Anthony himself) "players from inner-city high schools aren't academically qualified for college because of the lower quality of education compared to their suburban counterparts". This led him into conflict with Wilbon and Stephen A. Smith. On an April 2005 edition of NBA Shootaround, Anthony and Smith got into a heated debate about the age-limit. This came only days after Anthony was the primary interviewer in a discussion with Indiana Pacers forward Jermaine O'Neal.

The interview was described by Sports Illustrated writer Mark Bechtel as "...Greg Anthony putting words in O'Neal's mouth then saying something along the lines of, 'Is that what you meant?' And then O'Neal would say, 'Exactly.'" It came on the heels of O'Neal discussing the age limit in the context of race, and as he was in the midst of growing media attention and criticism.

As noted in the article "The Real Color of Money: Controlling Black Bodies in the NBA" by David Leonard, O'Neal was roundly attacked for his opinion, with many accusing him of playing the race card.

With the agreement on a new collective bargaining agreement, the age limit was put into place. Any person attempting to enter the NBA draft must wait until the calendar year of his 19th birthday, and must also be at least one year out of high school. However, since the implementation of these rules, certain players have used alternative methods to enter the draft, to the point where some players declare while even still playing in high school. Players like Brandon Jennings, Emmanuel Mudiay, and Terrance Ferguson have entered their respective NBA drafts while spending a year out overseas. More recently, some players like Satnam Singh, Thon Maker, and Matur Maker have entered their respective NBA drafts while being considered as high school postgraduates, meaning they've played a fifth year of high school basketball for various reasons instead of going to college. Furthermore, both Latavious Williams and Mitchell Robinson entered their NBA drafts by entering the NBA Development League (now NBA G League) and skipping out college for a year respectively.

No tolerance rule
At the start of the 2006–07 NBA season, the NBA instituted a new rule regarding in-game player complaints. The "no tolerance rule", as it was referred to by players and the media, allowed referees to call technical fouls when players complained too vehemently about calls.

The season started with a spike in the number of technical fouls and ejections. There were "one-hundred-four technicals and seven ejections in the first fifty-one games", while "only seven games of the first fifty-one games thus far have had no technical fouls". Denver Nuggets forward Carmelo Anthony was ejected on opening night of the season after two technical fouls.

Some observers viewed the rule as unfair and taking the passion out of the game; others believed that it only served to take pressure off of referees who made bad calls.

Others agreed with the rule, viewing it as a much needed policy to cut down on the "whining" by players in the league.

After the initial spike at the start of the season, the amount of technical fouls and ejections declined significantly towards the middle of the year. Several players, including Denver Nuggets guard Allen Iverson, were still ejected on technical fouls; Iverson's ejection came during his first game against his former team, the Philadelphia 76ers, and he was later fined by the league for claiming that referee Steve Javie ejected him on the basis of a feud the two supposedly had.

Conspiracy theories

Big-market team bias/Lack of parity
Some NBA fans have accused the league of conspiring to have large-market teams and popular players succeed in the postseason. From 1980 to 2020, every NBA Finals involved at least one of the following teams: the Boston Celtics, Chicago Bulls, Detroit Pistons, Golden State Warriors, Houston Rockets, Los Angeles Lakers, Miami Heat or San Antonio Spurs. Additionally, in that span, every NBA Finals has involved at least one of the following All-Star players: Larry Bird, Magic Johnson, Isiah Thomas, Michael Jordan, Hakeem Olajuwon, Shaquille O'Neal, Tim Duncan, Kobe Bryant, LeBron James or Stephen Curry. The 2021 NBA Finals marked the first time that none of the aforementioned teams nor players competed in the NBA Finals that year, with the Milwaukee Bucks defeating the Phoenix Suns in six games.

Many of these accusations are based on the premise that the NBA desires large markets and popular players for ratings purposes. Former CBS Sports president Neal Pilson disputes the idea that matchups have the biggest effect on ratings:

This conspiracy has only increased with the rise of so-called "superteams" in free agency, where star players (free agents or not) "team up" with other players of similar stature on a large-market team in a lucrative location. The term has evolved after being brought about by James' public free-agent declaration in 2010's The Decision. Notable examples of players leaving a smaller market to either join or create said "superteam" include James (Cleveland to Miami), Kevin Durant (Oklahoma City to Golden State), and Paul George (Oklahoma City to LA Clippers). The first two moves in particular drew considerable backlash, especially James's due to favorite son status in his home state. Some have even speculated this has caused NBA ratings in recent seasons to drop due to a lack of narrative surprise in the regular season.

1984 NBA Finals – Celtics vs. Lakers

The 1984 NBA Finals was highly anticipated, with the Boston Celtics and the Los Angeles Lakers playing in their eighth Finals matchup ever since their first showdown in 1959. It also featured two of the biggest young stars of the era, Larry Bird and Magic Johnson, who had previously faced off in the finals of the 1979 NCAA Division I Basketball Tournament, where Magic's Michigan State team defeated Bird's Indiana State squad.

Game 6 proved controversial when the Lakers were sent to the foul line on numerous occasions thanks to questionable calls. This led Larry Bird to claim that Commissioner David Stern had requested that the game be officiated in the Lakers' favor in hopes of extending the series to a seventh game.

Despite his conspiracy claim, the Celtics did win in Game 7, earning a 111–102 victory.

1988 NBA Finals – Pistons vs. Lakers 

The 1988 NBA Finals was yet another highly anticipated matchup, with the Detroit Pistons entering into the Finals for the first time ever against the Los Angeles Lakers. It also featured two of the biggest stars in their prime with Magic Johnson and Isiah Thomas.

The Pistons took a 3–2 series lead. With 14 seconds remaining in Game 6 and the Pistons up 102–101, Bill Laimbeer was called for a foul on Kareem Abdul-Jabbar. Laimbeer fouled out on the call and Abdul-Jabbar made both free throws to give the Lakers a 103–102 victory. The Lakers won Game 7 108–105, clinching the title. In his 1993 book, The Winner Within, Lakers coach Pat Riley referred to the call as "that phantom skyhook foul."

2001 Eastern Conference Finals – Bucks vs. Sixers
In 2001, the Milwaukee Bucks played the Philadelphia 76ers in the Eastern Conference Finals. The small-market Bucks (who had not even been featured on NBC that year prior to the second round of the Playoffs) did not have any "big-time" stars, with the exception of Ray Allen (who, despite being popular, was not in the upper-echelon of NBA players in terms of endorsements). Their opponent that year, the 76ers had the polarizing and popular Allen Iverson, who had a multitude of shoe deals and mainstream recognition. The Sixers also featured that year's winners of the MVP award in Iverson, Defensive Player of the Year award in Dikembe Mutombo, Sixth Man of the Year award in Aaron McKie, and Coach of the Year award in Larry Brown. During game 5, there were numerous major favourable calls for the 76ers. Glenn Robinson had not gone to the foul line in any of the previous games, causing them to be viewed as suspect. Allen later voiced the claim that the league preferred the Sixers to be in the Finals as opposed to Milwaukee.

This controversy is largely based on complaints levied by members of the Bucks organization regarding the officiating of the series. Glenn Robinson, Sam Cassell and then-head coach George Karl joined Allen in complaining about the officiating and hinting that the league was against them. Karl and Allen were both fined for their comments. In Game 6 of the tensely fought series, Bucks forward Scott Williams threw an elbow at Iverson and was subsequently suspended for the deciding Game 7. (Iverson had already missed a game, the Bucks Game 3 win, and been limited in others after being hit by the Bucks earlier in the series.) After the Bucks lost Game 7 on the road, Sports Illustrated columnist Marty Burns insinuated that the suspension may have been a form of payback by the league:

While normally a starter, Williams generally played limited minutes and averaged just over 4 points per game during the portion of the series in which he played. He was suspended because this was his third flagrant foul of the playoffs.

The Sixers were fourth in the league in regular season free throws attempted. The Bucks, largely a jump shooting team, were 25th.

2002 Western Conference Finals – Kings vs. Lakers
The 2002 Western Conference Finals between the Sacramento Kings and Los Angeles Lakers was one of the most memorable in league history. The popular (though small-market) Kings led the two-time defending NBA champion Lakers three games to two heading into Game 6 at Staples Center, a game which would prove to be the most infamous of the series. The game, which the Lakers won by four, featured several disputable calls, including a late game no-call involving Mike Bibby—after he was bleeding from being elbowed in the nose by Kobe Bryant. This game was the epitome of the major issue in the series. Both teams complained about the officiating at different points in the series (the Kings in Game 6 and the Lakers in Games 2 and 5). Quoting then-ESPN basketball analyst David Aldridge:

Former presidential candidate Ralph Nader weighed in on the series, voicing his displeasure with the officiating:

The Kings would go on to lose Game 7 of the series at home. Former NBA referee Tim Donaghy filed in court papers in 2008 saying that Game 6 was fixed by the NBA. NBA Commissioner David Stern denied these allegations. Lawrence Pedowitz, who led a review of the league's officiating following the outbreak of the scandal, concluded that, while Game 6 was poorly officiated, no concrete evidence existed of that game being fixed.

Accusation from Jeff Van Gundy
During a 2005 playoff series against the Dallas Mavericks, Houston Rockets coach Jeff Van Gundy was fined a record amount for a coach, $100,000, for asserting that he had a source within the league who informed him that the referees were being instructed to call more fouls on Yao Ming, due to protests by Mavericks owner Mark Cuban.

2006 NBA Finals – Dallas vs. Miami

The 2006 NBA Finals came the year after a series that saw the second-lowest ratings in NBA Finals history. After the Detroit Pistons and the small-market San Antonio Spurs slugged it out in a seven-game series, the 2006 Finals was considered more attractive because it featured the relatively large markets Miami Heat and Dallas Mavericks and superstars Dirk Nowitzki, Shaquille O'Neal, and Dwyane Wade.

With the series tied at two games apiece, Game 5 was pivotal. On the final possession in overtime, Wade received an inbounds pass from mid court. Because Wade had already been in the front court prior to the inbounds of the ball, some argue that he should have been ruled ineligible to receive the pass in the backcourt and the Heat should have been called for a backcourt violation. After receiving the ball, Wade went on to drive to the basket, drawing a foul on Nowitzki. Replays would reveal that Nowitzki barely touched Wade, further angering Mavericks fans. However, the replay also showed Mavericks' guard Devin Harris grabbing Wade's arm. In between Wade's free throws, Maverick Josh Howard looked to coach Avery Johnson to see if he wanted to call for time. Howard made a timeout gesture towards his coach; referee Joe Derosa saw this and charged Dallas with their final timeout.

Without a timeout, the Mavericks were forced to inbound from full court after Wade hit his second free throw. Unable to get off a shot from inside of half court as time expired, the Mavericks lost the game and the series two nights later. Game 5 had 38 fouls called against the Mavericks with only 26 against the Heat. The Mavericks shot 25 free throws as the Heat shot 49. After Game 5, Mavericks owner Mark Cuban was livid; he was quoted by The Miami Herald as screaming at David Stern that "[his] league is rigged". Cuban denied making the statement, and went on to write:

Despite his denial, Cuban was fined $250,000 by the league, not for his alleged comments, but for general "acts of misconduct" following the game.

In Game 5, Wade shot a total of 25 free throws, equaling the entire Mavericks team total.

In Game 6, suspicions ran even higher as the Heat were awarded 37 free throws compared to the Mavericks’ 23. Wade shot a total of 21 free throws, nearly matching the Mavericks’ team total, including those from a foul called after bumping into Nowitzki, who was standing in Wade's way during the last 10 seconds of play, which cost them the game and allowed the Heat to walk away with their first championship. Following the season, Mavericks owner Mark Cuban allegedly hired a former FBI agent to investigate the series. He supposedly dropped this investigation due to the risk of him being banned from the league for life.

2007 Western Conference Semi-finals – Suns vs. Spurs
In what some media outlets claimed were the true 2007 NBA Finals that year, the 2007 Western Conference Semi-Finals match bettered heated rivals in the Phoenix Suns and the San Antonio Spurs under what would be the most controversial series between the two to date. The popular Phoenix Suns squad under the Seven Seconds or Less and the small-market San Antonio Spurs kicked off the series with a 111–106 Spurs win with a collision between Steve Nash and Tony Parker, with Nash having a deep cut on his nose that later forced him to sit out for a good portion of Game 1. After a dominant 101–81 performance from the Suns in Game 2, the Spurs would end Game 3 with a 108–101 win over the Suns and Manu Ginóbili would have a bruised, black eye after he was poked by Shawn Marion. However, near the end of Game 4, the series would reach its critical breaking point.

In the last minute of Game 4, where the Suns would win 104–98 and even up the series, Robert Horry of the Spurs collided with Steve Nash during a play and pushed Nash into the scorer's table mid-court. During this altercation, Raja Bell of the Suns would try to help his teammate out of there, but was stopped by the referees and players at hand, including Amar'e Stoudemire and Boris Diaw, who were on the team's bench at the time of the altercation. As a result of the altercation between Horry and Nash, not only would Horry receive a two-game suspension for his outburst, but Diaw and Stoudemire would also be suspended for Game 5 as well, with the only rule that league commissioner David Stern said they violated at that point was leaving the bench during an altercation. Suns head coach Mike D'Antoni weighed in on the suspensions of Stoudemire and Diaw, seeing as how they were important pieces for the Suns, questioning the fairness on their suspensions despite not being instigators in it:

The suspensions would prove to be the Suns' downfall near the end of the series. Despite leading most of Game 5 at home, the Suns would lose it 88–85 and would then lose Game 6 and the series in San Antonio 114–106, being down by as many as 20 points in the third quarter at one point despite the returns of Stoudemire and Diaw. The call on their suspensions would be further questioned and criticized in 2009 after a similar situation occurred with the Boston Celtics, yet certain key players on their team didn't receive similar suspensions themselves. In the aftermath of the 2007 Playoffs, one of the referees that was involved with this series, Tim Donaghy, was involved in a betting scandal that claimed fix-ups on certain NBA games and playoff series. During a 2011 interview, he admitted that he felt the Suns were the better team that season, but the series was poorly officiated from the very start until the bitter end. In his 2009 book Personal Foul: A First-Person Account of the Scandal That Rocked the NBA, Donaghy stated the following about the series, particularly about his supervisor during the series, Tommy Nuñez:

2007 NBA Finals – San Antonio vs. Cleveland

The 2007 NBA Finals are considered to have the lowest television ratings in NBA history, after the San Antonio Spurs swept the Cleveland Cavaliers. Many fans instead expected a Detroit Pistons rematch with the Spurs from the 2005 NBA Finals. Rasheed Wallace, who then played power forward for the Pistons following the 2006–07 NBA season, claimed that the league wanted to make more money by featuring LeBron James in the Finals instead of the Pistons, just to make more excitement rather than the boring matches like they had two years ago.

Despite his controversial statement around the start of the next season, the Pistons were able to make it back to the 2008 NBA Playoffs as a second seed, in which they managed to defeat Philadelphia after rallying from a 2 games to 1 deficit and Orlando in the next round 4 games to 1, before reaching the Eastern Conference Finals again and ending up losing to the eventual champion Boston Celtics for the third year in a row. That would lead to the downfall of the team following the start of the 2008-09 NBA season, in which several players from their 2004 championship team either ended up departing or retiring.

2009 Eastern Conference First Round – Bulls vs. Celtics
During a 2009 playoff series between the Boston Celtics and Chicago Bulls, many Bulls fans felt that the referees were favoring the Celtics. In Game 5, Celtics guard Rajon Rondo made hard contact with the face of Bulls' center Brad Miller, with just 2 seconds left in overtime with the Celtics leading by two. Earlier in Game 5, Rondo tripped Bulls guard Kirk Hinrich, forcing him to get stitches to close the resulting wounds he got from being tripped. The hit on Miller left him with a bleeding mouth, but because the foul was ruled a personal foul, Miller had to shoot the free throws, or he would not have been allowed to return, and the Celtics would pick the replacement shooter. Had the foul been ruled a flagrant, the Bulls would have been able to pick the replacement shooter. Miller would miss the first free throw, and then had to miss the second on purpose to give the Bulls a chance to tie the game, but the free throw did not hit the rim and the Celtics got possession and ran out the clock. Rondo admitted after the game that he did not have a play on the ball.

In Game 6, near the end of the first quarter, Rondo threw Hinrich into the scorer's table in a fashion similar to Robert Horry's body slam of Steve Nash 2 years earlier. Rondo was assessed a flagrant 1, which allowed for him to stay in the game, rather than a flagrant 2 which would have meant an ejection (which was Horry's punishment for his similar foul). Furthermore, after both games, the league reviewed the incidents in question and decided not to suspend Rondo or upgrade the fouls, while Horry's body slam earned him a 2-game suspension. Meanwhile, Orlando Magic center Dwight Howard was suspended for Game 6 of the Magic's series vs. the Philadelphia 76ers after the league reviewed tape of him elbowing Sixers center Samuel Dalembert in the head in Game 5. It was ruled a technical on the floor, but after review, the league upgraded the foul to a flagrant 2.

2009 NBA Finals – Magic vs. Lakers

The 2009 NBA Finals was one of the most forgettable matchups and featured the Orlando Magic and Los Angeles Lakers. It was mockingly dubbed as the 'Disney Series'. While many fans claimed that it should've been a matchup between Cleveland and the Lakers and a duel of superstars Kobe Bryant and LeBron James following the knee injury of Boston Celtics' power forward Kevin Garnett, others believed the Magic should have won the championship instead of the Lakers, due to many calls which were claimed to have been favouring the Lakers, along with nine out of ten analysts favouring the Lakers to be the winning team, compared to only one favouring the Magic to win. Many of the news also hinted about Jameer Nelson returning to the line up to play during the regular season, where he led the Magic to sweep the Lakers following the presumable season-ending injury of a torn labrum in his right shoulder during a home game vs. Dallas on February 2, 2009. But it was later confirmed that he would be playing. While the series went to L.A. with the Lakers up 2–0, it went back to Orlando for game 3. A controversial call on Dwight Howard after attempting to block Kobe Bryant has raised questions for the league about favoring L.A all the way. Following the call, Bryant only hit one out of two free throw at the line. In the game, Los Angeles had a terrible free throw percentage, which lead to Orlando winning that game.
 
In Game 4, the most intense moment of the game came during the first half. The Magic had a 12-point lead and outscored the Lakers by as much as 49-37 before going into halftime. In the third quarter, the Lakers came out and outscored the Magic 30–14 and took the lead 67–62. Questioning about Stan Van Gundy wanting to keep Jameer Nelson playing for rest of the 4th quarter came under heavy criticism for not letting Rafer Alston to play, especially with the decision of whether or not to foul Orlando with 11 seconds left, which ultimately led to their downfall heading into Overtime following Derek Fisher hitting a pivotal 3-pointer to tie it at 87 due to Nelsons poor defense and was questioned after the game.

Another argument came during overtime, with Nelson and Lewis double teaming Bryant, Nelson got hit by Bryant's elbow and no foul was called, before Fisher hit another 3-pointer to take the lead 94–91, which let the Lakers win the game by that score and take a 3–1 lead. That raised questions about which calls the referees failed to call, following another infamous series years ago, in which a similar incident happened in Game 6 of that season's Western Conference Finals after Kobe's elbow to Mike Bibby with less than 30 seconds left. Only this time with Jameer Nelson, but was rebuffed.

Later on, Rafer Alston's commented on the league for the no call.
 

 
However, all arguments about the officiating fell on deaf ears as the Lakers won  game 5 for their 15th championship.

NBA Draft
The 1985 NBA draft was the first to use the NBA Draft Lottery. Prior to that year, there was a coin flip between the teams with the worst record in each conference to see which team would get the first pick in the draft. The Golden State Warriors, which represent the San Francisco Bay Area, finished with the worst record in the NBA during the 1984–85 season and would have had the first draft choice under the previous system. That year, Georgetown center Patrick Ewing was the favorite to be the number one pick in the draft. The lottery was established out of concern that the Houston Rockets had been intentionally playing poorly in order to draft the best players, such as centers Ralph Sampson and Hakeem Olajuwon in 1983 and 1984 respectively.

During the first live televised draft lottery ceremony, the league used a system where sealed envelopes representing the teams with the worst records were mixed in a tumbler, and then drawn by NBA Commissioner David Stern one at a time to determine which of these clubs would get the first pick onwards. According to particularly popular urban legend regarding the 1985 draft, when these envelopes were added to the tumbler, one envelope was put in forcibly and banged against the edge, bending the corner, while all the rest of the envelopes were set in gently. While there is no evidence to prove this assertion, the large-market New York Knicks, who finished with the third-worst record in the league that season, eventually used the first pick to draft Ewing who would become a legend on the team and lead the Knicks to the 1994 NBA Finals. (Although the Knicks also reached the 1999 NBA Finals, Ewing was injured during that time). Nevertheless, the "bent envelope" fueled speculation that the league staged the result. As a response to the controversy, the NBA would update their system to the more modern weighted lottery system in 1990, which gives the worst teams better odds at receiving the top 3 (later 4) picks of the NBA draft. Nevertheless, the system would receive updates in both 1994, when the Orlando Magic landed back-to-back #1 picks despite their second year having only one lottery combination possible in their chances of winning it, and 2019, after noticing the Philadelphia 76ers looked to lose on purpose for multiple seasons for higher draft picks under Sam Hinkie's regime.

For the 2003 NBA draft, the Cleveland Cavaliers and Denver Nuggets each had equal chances of drafting first overall, with the Cavaliers ultimately winning out. With high school basketball standout and future four-time NBA MVP LeBron James being the consensus number one pick in that year's draft, there was some speculation as to whether or not that year's lottery was rigged in favor of the Cavaliers, due to James being a native of nearby Akron, Ohio. Following James' departure for the Miami Heat in 2010, the Cavaliers would be involved in further speculation in regards to winning three out of four NBA drafts between 2011 and 2014, some of which included the idea of LeBron James returning to the Cavaliers altogether from these drafts; James would ultimately return to Cleveland in 2014.

For the 2008 NBA draft, despite having a 1.6% chance of obtaining the number one pick, projected by many to be Chicago native Derrick Rose, the Chicago Bulls still were awarded the first overall pick and subsequently selected Rose as the first pick. Rose would go on to win NBA Rookie of the Year in the 2008–09 season and would win the NBA MVP in the 2010–2011 season while leading the Bulls to the Eastern Conference Finals that same season.

The New Orleans Hornets won the rights to the first overall selection in the 2012 draft. The Hornets were a league-owned team prior to the draft, leading to continued conspiracy theories about the lottery process. Further suspicions were raised in 2016 and 2017, where former 76ers player Dikembe Mutombo congratulated Philadelphia for winning the first overall pick in the 2016 draft early via Twitter and recently hired Lakers president of basketball operations Magic Johnson and coach Luke Walton stating that the Lakers were going to get a Top 3 pick in the 2017 draft despite having higher odds of losing the pick to Philadelphia weeks before the draft lottery even began that year respectively. The latter selection also had the Lakers be in prime position to take Lonzo Ball, a prime high school and college standout point guard from nearby Chino Hills, California, with his father LaVar talking about him being on the Lakers months before the event took place.

Fines and suspensions

Criticism of referees and officiating 
Players, coaches or front office members criticizing referees, officials or suggesting in any way that the league has conspiracy theories would result in an automatic fine of a minimum of $25,000. Media and fans see this as the league trying to discourage such discussions and comments, as they indeed have things to hide. The league also fears such would have impact ratings and popularity, resulting in lower ratings and most importantly, revenue.

Gestures 
Sam Cassell's Big Cahones dance celebration (from Major League II) are now seen as "obscene gestures". Among those who have also been fined for "dancing" are Caron Butler, Andray Blatche, Marco Belinelli, Andre Iguodala, Jameer Nelson and Fred VanVleet. The fine has been documented to be a minimum of $15,000.

Restgate and scheduling 
In November 2012, San Antonio Spurs coach Gregg Popovich was fined $250,000 for sending four players home (including stars Tim Duncan, Tony Parker and Manu Ginóbili) before a nationally televised game against the defending champion Miami Heat. It was the Spurs' fourth game in five nights and sixth game in nine nights, all of which were on the road. Commissioner David Stern released a letter before the game claiming Popovich had done a disservice to the league, fans and Miami ticket buyers by not giving them the game they paid to see. Most disagreed with Stern, saying Miami fans were there to see LeBron James and the Heat, not the Spurs. Many felt this was a cultural revenge move by Stern, who in the past had openly admitted he disliked the Spurs' success due to the lack of ratings they brought to the Finals as a small market team. The Spurs ended up leading for most of the game and only lost in the last minute, making Stern appear even more foolish for claiming the game was ruined before it even began. Stern later said that if Popovich had simply kept the players with the team he wouldn't have fined him, which went against his initial claim that the product on the court was diminished by who didn't play.

The incident also called into question the league's scheduling practices, such as cramming so many games into a short amount of time, especially like in the Spurs' case where the team had to travel between each game. Some called for an end to four-games-in-five-nights and five-games-in-seven-nights situations as it could put the players' health at risk and diminishes the product on the court.

Joey Crawford
Joey Crawford was once suspended by the league after a confrontation with Spurs forward Tim Duncan. Duncan was ejected for laughing on the sidelines in a game against the Mavericks in the 2006–07 season. After a meeting between Crawford and the league office, the NBA decided to suspend Crawford for the remainder of the season and made him attend anger management courses.

Selective TV replays
While the league has implemented TV replays, as of the 2013–14 season, plays are not reviewable unless they are end of quarter plays, as well as the last 2 minutes of regulation and overtime periods. In many cases, referees have opted not to review final plays of the game, which would have impact on the final win–loss outcome. In the 2013–14 season, regular season games such as the Heat-Pacers, Mavericks-Timberwolves, Mavericks-Pelicans, Clippers-Mavericks, games have resulted in the controversial calls in the final play of the game that changed the outcome. In some cases, the NBA issued official statements after the game, admitting to the errors; however, the game's outcome remained unchanged. Many believe that such statements merely made as a PR move, although no action is done to improve the integrity of the game.

Many criticize too much time spent on replays that could have been resolved within short amounts of time. Oftentimes, the amount of time spent puts the game into long halts. The league is seen as intentionally operating in a way to give negative perception of replays in general, as well as merely exaggerating their image of trying to keep the integrity of the game honest.

Accusations of network bias

During its twelve-year run of covering the NBA, NBC Sports televised a substantial number of games featuring the Chicago Bulls, New York Knicks and Los Angeles Lakers. In the prime-time slot, from 5:30 p.m EST to 8:00 p.m EST, NBC aired games almost exclusively featuring New York City, Chicago or Los Angeles (incidentally, those three cities are the top three television markets in the United States, and have been historically the three most populous cities). Several fans and media analysts viewed this as favoritism, and fans of teams like the Houston Rockets who, despite being a large market (and Houston being the USA's fourth most populous city), being one of the best teams in the early-to-mid-1990s, winning the title in 1994 and 1995, and featuring a superstar in Hakeem Olajuwon, were not featured on NBC at the level of the other three teams, felt as if they were being snubbed.

Until 1998, the Chicago Bulls were a dominant team, and during the early to mid-1990s, the New York Knicks were also in the NBA's elite. From 1997 to 2002, the Los Angeles Lakers also joined the ranks of the best in the NBA.

Microfiber game ball
After the 2005–06 season, David Stern announced that the league would use a new microfiber ball for the 2006–07 season. The microfiber ball replaced the previously used leather balls. The league claimed the new ball would provide better grip than the leather counterparts, especially when wet from player's sweat. Still the majority of players (notably Phoenix Suns point guard Steve Nash) expressed dislike for the new ball, saying among other things that it became slippery when wet, bounced awkwardly and gave players cuts.

The largest complaint came from the fact that players had not been consulted before the new ball was put into play. The NBA Players Association filed an unfair labor practice lawsuit against the league because of that fact, subsequently dropping it after the league announced that it would revert to the leather balls starting on January 1, 2007. In a humorous move, the Washington Wizards played a video on the Verizon Center scoreboard welcoming back the "new old ball". Despite complaints, scoring and field goal percentage went up while the microfiber ball was used. Some individual players, however, including Chicago Bulls guard Ben Gordon and then Seattle SuperSonics guard Ray Allen, saw their usually high three-point shooting percentages decline.

A more rigorous study found that while shooting percentages did in fact increase, so did turnover rates.

In the aftermath, Commissioner Stern said that players would have more input on future decisions.

Referee gambling scandal

In July 2007, reports of an investigation by the Federal Bureau of Investigation (FBI) were made public, which alleged that during the 2005–06 and 2006–07 NBA seasons, referee Tim Donaghy bet on games in which he officiated. On August 15, 2007, Donaghy pleaded guilty to two federal charges related to the investigation, and a year later he was sentenced to 15 months in prison and three years of supervised release. As a result, the general reaction by the media was that the NBA's popularity would be hurt by the news of this scandal.

Embracing NBA Sports Betting 
Prior to the 2010s, the NBA was particularly sensitive to gambling due to violations in the mid 2000s by Tim Donaghy. However, since the 2010s the NBA's position on sports betting has changed significantly.

The NBA, along with the NFL, MLB, NHL and the U.S. Justice Department brought litigations against the State of New Jersey to stop the legalization of sports betting in 2012. They argued that New Jersey's plan was in direct violation of the Professional and Amateur Sports Protection Act (PASPA). In 2018, the Court ruled that PASPA was unconstitutional in the U.S. Supreme Court decision Murphy v. NCAA. Due to this ruling on PASPA, it allowed all 50 states to choose whether they would legalize sports betting. As of January 2023, Washington D.C. and 36 other states have legalized sports betting with 3 states in the process of legalizing it currently.

Adam Silver, the current NBA Commissioner, held a important role in the eventual legalization of sports betting in many states. In a surprising op-ed for The New York Times in 2014, Silver wrote about the idea of legalizing and regulating sports betting. Although he was the commissioner of the NBA at the time when litigations were brought against the State of New Jersey, his stance in the op-ed argued that sports betting should be allowed on a federal level as long as the states comply with strict rules. He acknowledged that it was an untapped business that was thriving without any regulation or oversight. Some regulations that Silver proposed included minimum-age verification methods and methods to keep people with gambling addiction from being able to bet on games. Silver and the NBA's leadership team largely viewed sports betting as something that was a potential positive, especially in the case where there would be  uniform laws across all 50 states.

In 2019, the NBA signed a multi-year deal with the Las Vegas based MGM Resorts to make them the official gaming partner of the NBA and WNBA. This allowed the NBA to negotiate new deals with other sports operators that operate in both states that have already legalized sports betting and those that have not. Since 2019, the NBA also signed betting data partnerships with both Sportradar and Genius Sports which in turn has generated extra revenue for owners and players.

Gilbert Arenas/Javaris Crittenton gun incident 
On December 24, 2009, it was revealed that Gilbert Arenas of the Washington Wizards had admitted to storing unloaded firearms in his locker at Verizon Center and had surrendered them to team security. In doing so, Arenas not only violated NBA rules against bringing firearms into an arena, but also violated D.C. ordinances as well. On January 1, 2010, it was also reported that Arenas and teammate Javaris Crittenton had unloaded guns in the Wizards' locker room during a Christmas Eve argument regarding gambling debts. The D.C. Metropolitan Police and the U.S. Attorney's office began investigating, and on January 14, 2010, Arenas was charged with carrying a pistol without a license, a violation of Washington, D.C.'s gun-control laws. Arenas pleaded guilty on January 15 to the felony of carrying an unlicensed pistol outside a home or business. His sentencing hearing was scheduled for March 26.

On January 6, 2010, the NBA suspended Arenas indefinitely without pay until its investigation was complete. NBA Commissioner David Stern said in a statement that "his ongoing conduct has led me to conclude that he is not currently fit to take the court in an NBA game." By nearly all accounts, Stern felt compelled to act when Arenas' teammates surrounded him during pregame introductions prior to a game with the Philadelphia 76ers and he pretended to shoot them with guns made from his fingers. The Wizards issued a statement of their own condemning the players' pregame stunt as "unacceptable." On January 27, 2010, Arenas and Crittenton were suspended for the rest of the season, after meeting with Stern. Both players would be removed from the team at the end of the season, with Crittenton being waived and Arenas being traded to the Orlando Magic. Crittenton would never play in the NBA again after that season (eventually being involved with a manslaughter case), while Arenas would be amnestied a year later before finishing his NBA career with the Memphis Grizzlies in 2012.

2019–2020 Hong Kong protests

In early October 2019, the Houston Rockets general manager Daryl Morey issued a tweet that supported the 2019–2020 Hong Kong protests. The NBA subsequently apologized in a statement saying the tweet was "regrettable". The perceived insufficiency of the NBA's defense of Morey's tweet and double standard relative to the league's history of political activism were criticized by US politicians and third-party observers; critics further compared the incident to an October 2 South Park episode "Band in China" which parodies the self-censorship of the American entertainment industry to meet Chinese censorship demands. The statement also drew criticism from mainland Chinese state-run media for the perceived insufficiency of the apology and led to the suspension/termination of all mainland Chinese sponsors of the NBA. This led to both Republican and Democratic congresspeople, including Julian Castro, Marco Rubio and Ted Cruz to make public statements criticizing both Chinese and NBA actions.  NBA commissioner Adam Silver later defended the league's response to the tweet, supporting Morey's right to freedom of expression while also accepting the right of reply from the government of and businesses from mainland China.  An article by Fox Business said that the NBA would look to Africa and India for growth if the league were to sever ties with mainland China as a result of the tweet.

George Floyd protests
Following a four-month hiatus the NBA resumed play in August 2020 at the Bubble held at Walt Disney World during the COVID-19 pandemic. During the build-up to the closed-door tournament, the murder of George Floyd in May and the resurgence of Black Lives Matter protests during that time forced the hand of the NBA, a league looking to stand with its majority-Black player base. As a result, the league permitted players to wear league-approved messages on the back of their jerseys, and relaxed their long-standing position on not standing for the U.S. national anthem. The league also painted "BLACK LIVES MATTER" at center court for both of their venues for the tournament.

Many critics, mostly conservative news media personalities and politicians such as U.S. President Donald Trump and Ted Cruz, attacked the NBA for its public embracement of the movement. When Jonathan Isaac, an Orlando Magic player and a devout Evangelical Christian, both refused to kneel during the anthem in solidarity with his teammates or wear the team-approved "Black Lives Matter" t-shirt given to him, sales of his jersey rose in approval. On the other hand, San Antonio Spurs head coach Gregg Popovich and Miami Heat player Meyers Leonard received criticism for doing the same, though they wore the "Black Lives Matter" tees while standing.

NBA player walkout
In response to the shooting of Jacob Blake in Kenosha, Wisconsin, NBA players in the midst of their playoff anchored a wildcat strike in protest, setting off a chain reaction throughout North American sports where no professional games were played in any major league on August 26. While this did not receive major backlash as the earlier social-justice focused programs did, it represented a showing of player power that many American sports fans have found themselves uncomfortable with, especially with regard to the NBA.

The league and its players formed several initiatives in the wake of the walkout, the most notable of them being a pledge to turn several NBA venues into voting sites for the upcoming U.S. presidential election.

2020 NBA Finals ratings
The record-low ratings for the 2020 NBA Finals, which saw the Los Angeles Lakers defeat the Miami Heat in six games, were widely panned by apolitical pundits and conservative critics, with myriad theories given as to why the ratings for the event dropped 65% from 2019. Some cited the NBA's embrace of the Black Lives Matter movement, while others cited the league's struggles in the ratings as playing at an abnormal time of year, especially with the MLB postseason and the NFL regular season—two traditional fall events—undercutting casual fan interest, as opposed to the traditionally robust numbers the NBA's final gets in June. Bobby Burack, a columnist for Outkick attributed the declining NBA ratings to the league's "woke" politics, cord-cutting, and the lack of playing time for star players. By contrast, Dan McQuade of Defector Media stated that critics of NBA players who express their personal political views on the court were relying on racist "coded language," likening it to the aforementioned dress code controversy.

See also

 National Football League controversies
 Criticism of NASCAR

References

Criticisms and controversies
 
Criticisms of companies